The South Carolina Miss Basketball honor recognized the top girls’ high school senior basketball player in the state of South Carolina. The award was presented annually by the Charlotte Observer.

Award winners

Schools with multiple winners

See also
South Carolina Mr. Basketball

References

Mr. and Miss Basketball awards
High school sports in South Carolina
Awards established in 1990
1990 establishments in South Carolina
Women's sports in South Carolina
Basketball in South Carolina
Lists of American sportswomen
Lists of people from South Carolina
Miss Basketball